Epipsestis cortigera is a moth of the family Drepanidae first described by Yoshimoto in 1995. It is found in Taiwan.

The wingspan is about 28 mm. The ground color of the forewings is ocherous, irrorated (sprinkled) with fuscous in the antemedian and subcostal areas, and tinged with some olive in the basal area. The hindwings are pale grayish fuscous, a little paler in the basal and inner area.

References

Moths described in 1995
Thyatirinae